Fellowship of the Royal Society is open to scientists, engineers and technologists from the United Kingdom and Commonwealth of Nations, on the basis of having made "a substantial contribution to the improvement of natural knowledge, including mathematics, engineering science and medical science". Election to the Fellowship is highly regarded and sought after, bringing prestige to both the individual academically and the institution the Fellow is associated with. For scientists in the United Kingdom, the recognition is considered second only to being awarded the Nobel Prize.

While there was no explicit prohibition of women as Fellow of the Royal Society in its original charters and statutes, election to the fellowships was for much of the Society's history de facto closed to women. As a result of the dissolution of nunneries in connection with the Dissolution of the Monasteries by Henry VIII, and female exclusion from schools and universities, the formal education of British girls and women was effectively non-existent throughout the 17th and 18th centuries. Women slowly gained admittance to learned societies in the UK starting in the 19th century, with the founding of the Zoological Society of London in 1829 and the Royal Entomological Society in 1833, both of which admitted women fellows from their inception.

The first recorded question of women being admitted to the Royal Society occurred in 1900, when Marian Farquharson, the first female fellow of the Royal Microscopical Society, sent a letter to the Council of the Royal Society petitioning that "duly qualified women should have the advantage of full fellowship". In its reply, the Council stated that the question of women fellows "must depend on the interpretation to be placed upon the Royal Charters under which the Society has been governed for more than three hundred years". When Hertha Ayrton was nominated for fellowship in 1902, her candidature was turned down on the basis that as a married woman she had no standing in law. The Sex Disqualification (Removal) Act 1919 made it illegal for an incorporated society to refuse admission on the grounds of an individual's sex or marital status. While the Society acknowledged the provision of section 1 of the Act in 1925, in reply to a question originally put to them by the Women's Engineering Society three years prior, it was not until 1943 that another woman was nominated for fellowship. Kathleen Lonsdale and Marjory Stephenson were duly elected in 1945, after a postal vote amending the Society's statutes to explicitly allow women fellows.

, a total of 198 women have been elected fellows. Two women have been elected under the Society's former Statute 12 regulation and two Honorary Fellows for their service to the cause of science. Another four women, from the British Royal Family, have been either Royal Fellow or Patron of the Society. Thirty six more women have been elected as Foreign Members. Of the approximately 1,600 living fellows and foreign members in 2018, 8.5 percent are women compared to 0.4% in 1945, according to a historical research project conducted by Aileen Fyfe and Camilla Mørk Røstvik.

Fellows

Foreign members

Honorary and Statute 12 fellows 
Between 1903 and 1996, Statute 12 of the Society permitted the council to elect someone who would not otherwise qualify for election under the normal criteria for "conspicuous service to the cause of science, or are such that their election would be of signal benefit to the Society". Statute 12 Fellows were replaced by the introduction of Honorary Fellows in 1997.

Royal fellows and patrons 
Throughout its history, the Royal Society has elected a number of individuals to its Fellowship by virtue of their being a member of the nobility. Such elections were restricted first in 1874 to princes and members of the Privy Council, and subsequently in 1903 to princes of the British Royal Family only. This has since been relaxed to allow the election of any member of the British Royal Family. Those elected by virtue of their royal blood or marriage are known as Royal Fellows. From the beginning of the practice of British royal patronage in the 18th century, the reigning monarch of Great Britain (and since 1801 that of the United Kingdom), starting with King George I, has always served as patron of the Society.

See also 
 List of Fellows of the Royal Society
 List of female scientists before the 21st century

References 
General

 
 
 

Specific

External links 
 Medals, Awards & Prize lectures of the Royal Society

.
.
Royal Society, Fellows, Female
Royal Society, Fellows, Female
Royal Society, Fellows, Female
Royal Society, Fellows, Female
Royal Society, Fellows, Female

.